The mangshanyegan (Citrus mangshanensis) is a wild citrus fruit species.

The mangshanyegan is native to mountain forests in Mangshan, Hunan province, China, where it was first reported in the 1980s.  It is genetically distinct from the mandarin orange, with which it has morphological similarities, and the term 'Mangshan wild mandarins' as well as the species name C. mangshanensis have been used both for the mangshanyegan and for wild true mandarins of the same region.  Genomic sequencing shows the mangshanyegan to be one of a small number of pure (non-hybrid) citrus species, having diverged from other members of the genus at the initial branching of Citrus radiation in the Late Miocene.  It is genetically similar to another wild citrus of the region, the yuanju.

References

Citrus